The Pakistani cricket team toured South Africa in the 1994–95 season. On the tour they played two first-class tour matches, three one-day matches and a single Test match. They also competed in a quadrangular tournament against New Zealand, South Africa and Sri Lanka, entitled the Mandela Trophy. They lost the best-of-three final series 2–0 to South Africa, having topped the table in the group stage. They lost the only Test by 324 runs.

Squads

Wasim Akram missed the South African leg of the tour with sinus trouble and was replaced by Ata-ur-Rehman. Aamer Nazir joined the tour party when Waqar Younis returned home injured.

Tour matches

Nicky Oppenheimer XI v Sri Lankans

This match did not have List A status.

50-over: Transvaal Invitation XI v Pakistanis
 
This match did not have List A status.

50-over: Eastern Cape Invitation XI v Pakistanis

This match did not have List A status.

First-class: Western Province v Pakistanis

First-class: Natal v Pakistanis

Mandela Trophy

Pakistan played in a quadrangular tournament with New Zealand, South Africa and Sri Lanka. Played in a round-robin format, all four teams played each other once, with the top two teams going through to a best-of-three final series to decide the winner.

Group stage

Final series

South Africa won the best of three final series against Pakistan 2-0.

1st Final

2nd Final

Test series

Only Test

Records
This match was the inaugural Test between Pakistan and South Africa. At the time, this was South Africa's second-largest Test victory by runs.

See also
New Zealand cricket team in South Africa in 1994–95
Mandela Trophy

Notes

External links
 CricketArchive
 Cricinfo
 Cricinfo: Test match averages

References
 Wisden Cricketers' Almanack 1996: The Pakistanis in South Africa and Zimbabwe, 1994-95

1994 in Pakistani cricket
1995 in Pakistani cricket
1994 in South African cricket
1995 in South African cricket
International cricket competitions from 1994–95 to 1997
1994-95
South African cricket seasons from 1970–71 to 1999–2000